Tijan (also Romanized as Tījān) is a village in Binalud Rural District, in the Central District of Nishapur County, Razavi Khorasan Province, Iran. At the 2006 census, its population was 99, in 23 families.

References 

Populated places in Nishapur County